VI World Rhythmic Gymnastics Championships were held from 15 November to 18 November 1973 in Rotterdam, Netherlands.

Medal table

Individuals

Clubs

Hoop

Note Initially, Gigova, Filipova and Robeva were the winners of the gold, silver and bronze medals, respectively. One month after the conclusion of the World Championships, FIG revised the results and presented two extra bronze medals to Patocska and Krachinnekova.

Ball

Ribbon

Individual All-Around

Groups

Group Final

Group Preliminary

References

Rhythmic Gymnastics World Championships
1973 in gymnastics
1973 in Dutch sport
International gymnastics competitions hosted by the Netherlands